Albert Hinrich Hussmann (1874–1946) was a German artist and sculptor specializing in horse and rider statues. He studied at the Academy of Fine Arts in Berlin. His statues were featured several times in the Great Berlin Art Exhibition.

References

1874 births
1946 deaths
Prussian Academy of Arts alumni
20th-century German sculptors
20th-century German male artists
German male sculptors